The Velvet Rope: Live in Concert is a live video album by American singer Janet Jackson. It was released on March 9, 1999, by Eagle Rock Entertainment.

Background and release
Recorded on October 11, 1998, at Madison Square Garden in New York City as part of The Velvet Rope Tour, the concert was broadcast live on HBO in the United States, and reached an audience of 15 million viewers in the US alone.  The concert would also be broadcast on the cable channel's international networks at later dates.

Q-Tip makes a special appearance during the performance of "Got 'til It's Gone". During the performance of "Rope Burn", Jackson picks an unsuspecting member of the audience onto stage and teases them with her performance which included a lap dance. Due to censorship laws, "Rope Burn" and "Any Time, Any Place" were left out of the release in Hong Kong, where the video was issued as a 17 track double VCD.

The full performance was later on released on DVD, Laser Disc and video cassette the same year, and has been certified Platinum by the RIAA It was nominated for 4 Emmy Awards, including "Outstanding Choreography","Outstanding Lighting Direction", "Outstanding Music Direction" and "Outstanding Technical Direction/Camera/Video for a Special". It won the Primetime Emmy Award for "Outstanding Technical Direction/Camera/Video for a Special" in 1999. The video was also nominated for "Outstanding Performance in a Variety Series/Special" and "Outstanding Variety Series/Special" at the 1999 NAACP Image Awards.

The Velvet Rope: Live in Concert was re-released as an individual DVD in 2001, 2004 and 2006 and was repackaged with Live in Hawaii and re-released as a double disc set in the US and Europe on November 14, 2004, and again in Europe with a different cover in 2005.

Track listing

Certifications

Release history
The Velvet Rope Tour: Live in Concert

Live in Hawaii/The Velvet Rope Tour

References

1998 live albums
1998 video albums
Albums recorded at Madison Square Garden
Eagle Rock Entertainment live albums
Eagle Rock Entertainment video albums
Janet Jackson video albums
Live video albums